Devi is the fictional character created by Shekhar Kapur and Virgin Comics, as part of their debut Shakti line, which focuses on Indian settings. The character is loosely based upon the mythological figure Durga.

Plot summary
Devi was a celestial warrior goddess created by the gods to fight the renegade god Bala in the 2nd century of man. When Bala rose again to threaten the universe, Devi was reborn within the body of a young woman named Tara Mehta.

The Devi entity had emerged within a warrior-woman of the Durapasya (human warriors of light) clan. She had led the armies of the gods and men on an all-out assault on Bala's Fortress.

After defeating Bala through hand-to-hand combat, which led to the fallen god being blinded, captured, and imprisoned by Bodha, the supreme Lord of creation inside Jwala, the fortress of fire and stone (hidden deep within the earth) she had created a source to hold the prayers of humanity and channel them to Aakashik, the story's representation of heaven, thus replenishing the powers of the other pure gods.
	 
The key to Bala's sarcophagus prison was entrusted to a creature of fire and stone called the Gatekeeper. 	

In the present, a woman by the name of Tara Mehta, who is the unawakened Devi incarnate, lives a posh lifestyle alongside her boyfriend Iyam (who was the former favorite general of Bala during the ancient battle, and currently Sitapur's most notorious ganglord). He also owns “the Abyss” night club.

An investigation by Inspector Rahul Singh, a functioning alcoholic of the Sitapur police who drinks alcohol in order to self-medicate an overactive supernatural ability, leads to pinpointing Iyam as a culprit. Meanwhile, Kratha, an Apsara - an assassin of heaven hired by Lord Bala using a woman named Amara Gaelle - goes to try to eliminate Tara Mehta before she becomes Devi. However, she is unsuccessful as the Durapasya kidnap and drug her before she can kill her target.

Tara comes into contact with the first Devi who attempts to lead Tara on the road to rebirth as the Devi. Inspector Rahul Singh follows Iyam to a private meeting with Amara where he learns of the supposed assassination attempt.

Iyam and Kratha come to a truce ending with Iyam paying Kratha double the amount of what she was paid by her previous master. Amara, Lord Bala's contact, kills 2 of Iyam's bodyguards who had captured Inspector Rahul thus freeing him and seemingly following her own agenda.

Characters
Devi - A supernatural entity created by the gods to defeat their enemy, Lord Bala.
Lord Bala - An evil god bent on conquering heaven and subjugating man to his will. He feeds on the forced worship of his followers and he plans to stop the modern era version of the Devi and also to find the Source so as to gain its power.
Tara Mehta - A woman from the city of Sitapura who is said to become the next incarnation of Devi.
Rahul Singh - A cynical burnt out alcoholic police officer who, by a strange turn of events, finds himself as the sidekick of the current Devi incarnate, Tara Mehta.
Kratha - An apsara assassin hired by Lord Bala to kill Tara Mehta.
Agantuk - A priest of the order of the Durapasya who advocates the "radical" idea of keeping the human host alive for the Devi entity. He is largely responsible for Tara's survival when the Devi entity manifests itself within her mind and body.

Issues
Issue #1 - BHAIRAVI 
(Title meaning in English : The terrifying beauty)

writer : Siddharth Kotian
artist : Mukesh Singh

The story of the original Devi and her battle against Bala and his hordes in the 2nd century of man.

Issue #2 - DWIJA 
(Title meaning in English : Twice born)

writer : Siddharth Kotian
artist : Mukesh Singh

Return of Bala in modern times and introduction of Tara Mehta, the devi incarnate in the city of Sitapur

Issue #3 - NAMAHA 
(Title meaning in English : Salutation)

writer : Samit Basu
artist : Mukesh Singh

Tara is kidnapped by the Durapasya, a cult of devi worshippers who initiate her transformation. The Apsara assassin Kratha arrives in Sitapur to kill Tara Mehta

Issue #4 - PRARAMBH 
(Title meaning in English : Beginning)

writer : Samit Basu
artist : Mukesh Singh

Tara is attacked by Kratha while still in trance and the priest Agantuk whisks her away in the nick of time to Durapasya headquarters.

Issue #5 - AAGAMAN 
(Title meaning in English : Arrival)

writer : Samit Basu
artist : Mukesh Singh

Tara's transformation into devi is complete, but as Kratha and Iyam storm the Durapasya temple, the human and the divine coexist in Tara.

Issue #6 - SAMSARA 
(Title meaning in English : The world at large)

writer : Samit Basu
artist : Aditya Chari

Issue #7 - SANDEHA 
(Title meaning in English : Doubt)

writer : Samit Basu
artist : Aditya Chari

Issue #8 - AKS 
(Title meaning in English : Reflection)

writer : Samit Basu
artist : Saumin Patel

Issue #9 - YUDH 
(Title meaning in English : War)

writer : Samit Basu
artist : Saumin Patel

Battle royale between the forces of Durapasya and Bala's hordes begin.

Issue #10 - SAMVARA 
(Title meaning in English : The slaying)

writer : Samit Basu
artist : Saumin Patel

The battle between Tara and Bala.

Issue #11 - ATEETA 
(Title meaning in English : The past)

writer : Saurav Mohapatra
artist(s) : Saumin Patel Siddharth Kotian Edison George

An enigmatic supernatural being is drawn towards the new DEVI and we get glimpses of Tara, Rahul and Kratha's past through his eyes.

Issue #12 - AHWAAN 
(Title meaning in English : The call)

writer : Saurav Mohapatra
artist(s) : Saumin Patel

Tara learns to control her DEVI powers to some degree and fights a dreaded mob boss who is trying to gain control of the Sitapur underworld.

Issue #13 

writer : Saurav Mohapatra
artist(s) : Saumin Patel

Tara and Kratha clash as the White Horseman manifests in Rahul's body declaring his intention to kill the DEVI, who he considers an abomination.

Issue #14,15 & 16 

These have been released. Please update the review of the same.

Reception
Critical response to Devi has generally been positive, especially towards the artwork, which has drawn almost unanimous praise.  The first two issues drew some criticism for lack of world development and cliché dialogue, but reviewers found these issues were resolved in Devi #3.  In terms of sales, Devi is the most popular comic of the Shakti line.

Credits
Issues #1-#2 written by Siddharth Kotain, art and cover by Mukesh Singh, and colours by J Nanjan.  Issues #3-#10 were written by Samit Basu. Issue #11 onwards are written by Saurav Mohapatra. Acclaimed creator Ron Marz has signed on as story consultant and editor for the series.

Collections

The series is being collected as trade paperbacks:

Volume 1 (collects #1-5, 144 pages, June 2007)
Volume 2 (collects #6-10, 144 pages, October 2007)
Volume 3 (collects #10-15, 144 pages, January 2008)
Volume 4 (collects #16-20, 144 pages, July 2008)

See also
Indian comics
Tara Mehta
Bala
Rahul Singh
Iyam
Kratha

References

External links
How Deepak Chopra's Virgin Comics is changing comic book industry
Review of first trade, Silver Bullet Comic Books, August 29, 2007

2006 comics debuts
2008 comics endings
Comics by Saurav Mohapatra
Fictional Indian people
Virgin Comics characters
Comics characters introduced in 2006
Female characters in comics
Comics about women